is a mountain located on Kuba-jima of Senkaku Islands in Ishigaki, Okinawa, Japan. It is the second highest point of the island, after Mount Chitose.

Mountains of Okinawa Prefecture
Senkaku Islands